The 2003–04 Wessex Football League was the 18th season of the Wessex Football League, and the last in which the league consisted of a single division. The league champions for the first time in their history were newcomers Winchester City. There was no promotion to the Southern League, but two clubs were relegated to a new Division Two for 2004–05, as the league was restructured and two new divisions were added.

For sponsorship reasons, the league was known as the Sydenhams Wessex League.

League table
The league consisted of one division of 22 clubs, the same as the previous season, after Eastleigh were promoted to the Southern League and one new club joined:
Winchester City, joining from the Hampshire League.

References

Wessex Football League seasons
8